João Acir Verle (November 29, 1939 – November 7, 2015) was a Brazilian economist and politician. He served as the 41st Mayor of Porto Alegre from 2002 to 2005.

References

1939 births
2015 deaths
Mayors of Porto Alegre
Brazilian economists
Workers' Party (Brazil) politicians